Sauzbash (Sawıźbaş) is a rural locality (a village) and the administrative centre of Sauzbashevsky Selsoviet, Krasnokamsky District, Bashkortostan, Russia. The population was 454 as of 2010. There are 9 streets.

Geography 
Sauzbash is located 46 km southwest of Nikolo-Beryozovka (the district's administrative centre) by road. Saklovo is the nearest rural locality.

References 

Rural localities in Krasnokamsky District